Typhoon Nanmadol, known in the Philippines as Super Typhoon Josie, was a powerful tropical cyclone that impacted Japan. The fourteenth named storm, seventh typhoon, and second super typhoon of the 2022 Pacific typhoon season, Nanmadol originated from a disturbance to the east of Iwo Jima which the Joint Typhoon Warning Center (JTWC) designated as a tropical depression on September 12. Later that same day, upon attaining tropical storm strength, it was named Nanmadol by the Japan Meteorological Agency (JMA).

The storm gradually became better organized, with its sustained winds reaching typhoon strength two days later. Following peak intensity, the storm began an eyewall replacement cycle and tracked north towards Japan, where it made landfall on Southern Kyushu on September 18. Later, Nanmadol became a severe tropical storm on September 19, before transitioning into an extratropical low early the next day.

In preparation for the storm, more than half a million people were evacuated in Japan, a rare "special warning" was issued for Kagoshima by the JMA. In Kagoshima, 8,000 fled their homes, with another 12,000 in evacuation shelters. In South Korea, 7,000 households also experienced power outages. Four deaths were attributed to Nanmadol, all in Japan, and more than 115 people were injured, with most just being minor injuries.

Meteorological history 

The origins of Typhoon Nanmadol can be traced back to an area of disturbed weather on September 9. A tropical depression developed, according to the Japan Meteorological Agency (JMA). Satellite imagery revealed an obscure low-level circulation center. Microwave imaging indicated a low-level circulation with a deep convection. Formative banding blossomed around the disturbance and a LLC appeared on Himawari 8. At 02:00 UTC on September 12, the United States Joint Typhoon Warning Center (JTWC) issued a Tropical Cyclone Formation Alert to the disturbance. Later around the same day, the JTWC initiated advisories on the system and classified it as Tropical Depression 16W. A broad low-level circulation with a disorganized over its convective.Six hours later, the JMA and the JTWC upgraded the system to a tropical storm, with the JMA assigning the name Nanmadol for the system. The low-level banding wrapped in the deepening LLC. Nanmadol quickly intensified, and was upgraded to a severe tropical storm by the JMA on September 14. Microwave imaging revealed a well-defined banding feeder from the north and south on the storm's quadrants. Convective banding and a ragged eye formed. Similarly, the JMA further upgraded Nanmadol to a typhoon. A central convection had dense, along with having colder convective tops.

Nanmadol strengthened to a Category 2-equivalent typhoon after the inner core became more organized. On September 16, the storm became a Category 3-equivalent typhoon and an eye that was trying to cleared out. Then, it rapidly strengthened into a Category 4-equivalent typhoon as it maintained a  sharply-outlined eye around the eyewall. At around 15:00 UTC, the JTWC classified Nanmadol as a super typhoon.

Nanmadol entered the Philippine Area of Responsibility, and was named Josie before eventually exiting 5 hours later. Multispectral animated satellite imagery revealed a  surrounded eye around a deep convection. The next day, Nanmadol weakened back to a Category 4-equivalent typhoon. Satellite imagery revealed a rapid weakening on the system. At 03:00 UTC on September 18, the JTWC further downgraded it to a Category 3-equivalent typhoon. Nanmadol weakened further into a Category 2-equivalent typhoon as its structural strength began to rapidly deteriorate. Nanmadol's were estimated at just , which made it a Category 1-equivalent typhoon and made landfall over Southern Kyushu and a second landfall just south of Kagoshima around 18:00 UTC. At 00:00 UTC on September 19, the JMA downgraded Nanmadol to a severe tropical storm. The JTWC followed suit later that day, and declaring it tropical storm. Satellite imagery revealed a swallowing convection shearing in the northeastwards. At 21:00 UTC that day, the JTWC issued their final warning on the system. The JMA issued its last advisory on Nanmadol, and declared it an extratropical low on September 20.

Preparations and Impact

Japan

Nanmadol was forecasted to be among the top five strongest typhoons to hit Japan. It was also predicted to interact with a jet stream, enhancing the risk of already concerning flooding. A rare special warning was issued for Kagoshima by the JMA; before Nanmadol, these warnings were never issued outside of Okinawa. Japan Airlines and All Nippon Airways cancelled 700 flights, and train services experienced severe delays. Areas affected by Typhoon Hinnamnor two weeks prior were also anticipated to be under Nanmadol's influence. Overall, nearly 7 million people were ordered to evacuate as the storm approached. Of those 7 million, at least 965,000 were in Miyazaki, Kagoshima, and Amakusa. The highest alert on Japan's warning scale, level five, was issued for the city of Nishinoomote.

Throughout the afternoon of September 18, Miyazaki saw over 15 inches of rain (381 mm) fall, where the JMA noted it was "raining like never before". Power lines were downed across affected areas, and at least 190,000 had experienced power outages as Nanmadol passed. In Kagoshima, over 8,000 fled their homes with another 12,000 in evacuation shelters. Prime Minister Fumio Kishida mobilized police, firefighters, self-defense forces and another authorities in affected regions. Several rivers in four prefectures, Kagoshima, Oita, Miyazaki and Kumamoto, went above flood risk levels. 100 dams were pre-discharged to prevent flooding, a higher number than the 76 discharged for Typhoon Haishen.

At least 114 people were injured as Nanmadol passed. At least most injuries were minor. A crane from a construction site in Koryo-ocho had broken and nearly fell. Trees were fallen in affected areas, and many houses were damaged, injuring many residents in cities. Cars were trapped in roads due to flooding, and some people had to climb to the roof of their vehicles. A landslide in Tojo city left a road impassable. A nursing home was flooded in Nobeoka city, and temporary shelter buildings were blown away in Miyazaki city. In the latter city's prefecture, a month's worth of rain was dumped in a day. The highest rainfall total reached more than 39 inches of rainfall in Misato Town. Higher-risk reinsurance arrangements were affected by Nanmadol. At least four people were reported as killed in the country.

South Korea
Although South Korea was not directly hit by the typhoon, the winds and rain caused by Nanmadol also caused inconvenience. Two people were injured, fallen trees were reported, and some locations in the southeast of the country were left without electricity. Nanmadol brought heavy rains in the Southeastern Gyeongsang. 7,000 households also experienced a power outages. Over 50 vessels in 43 routes were suspended. President Yoon Suk-yeol instructed his officials to maintain readiness on the storm. In Busan, 155 people and 103 households were evacuated from their homes. Schools in Busan and Ulsan transitioned to distance learning due to safety concerns. Some 101 passenger vessels, and over 79 routes in southern coast were suspended.

See also 

 Weather of 2022
 Tropical cyclones in 2022
 1934 Muroto typhoon – the most intense landfalling typhoon in Japanese history, with a peak low pressure of 
 Typhoon Nancy (1961) – another Category 5-equivalent typhoon that hit southwestern Japan and remains among the most intense landfalling Pacific typhoons on record
 Typhoon Olive (1971) – a relatively weaker typhoon which hit southwestern Japan
 Typhoon Oliwa (1997) – an intense typhoon that impacted the same general areas of Japan
 Typhoon Meari (2004) – a strong typhoon which also impacted southwestern Japan
 Typhoon Trami (2018) – another powerful typhoon which also struck western Japan
 Typhoon Kong-rey (2018) – another intense typhoon that had a similar path.

References

External links 

JTWC Best Track Data of Super Typhoon 16W (Nanmadol)
16W.NANMADOL from the U.S. Naval Research Laboratory

2022 Pacific typhoon season
Tropical cyclones in 2022
September 2022 events in Asia
Typhoons in Japan
Typhoons in South Korea
Typhoons
2022 meteorology